The president of the Council of Ministers of Peru, informally called Premier (form of address) or Prime Minister, is the head of the cabinet as the most senior member of the Council of Ministers. The president of the Council of Ministers is appointed by the president of Peru (pending ratification by Congress, as with all other cabinet members).

The president of the Council of Ministers is not the head of government, since, the president of Peru serves both as head of state and head of government. Peru is one of the few countries in Latin America (others include Argentina, Cuba, and Haiti) where the position of prime minister currently exists. The current prime minister is Alberto Otárola.

Reform
There has been recent debate on whether the prime minister's role should be strengthened, effectively making the prime minister Peru's head of government and transforming the country into a semi-presidential system like in countries such as France and Ukraine. This idea was supported by former Peruvian presidents Alan García, Alejandro Toledo, Ollanta Humala, Pedro Pablo Kuczynski, Martín Vizcarra and Francisco Sagasti.

List of prime ministers of Peru (1856–present)

References

External links
Presidencia del Consejo de Ministros  (government website)
World Statesmen – Peru

 
1856 establishments in Peru
Government ministries of Peru
Lists of political office-holders in Peru